Hecla Island may refer to:

Hecla-Grindstone Provincial Park in Canada
Hecla Island (Western Australia)